Shadisha Robinson (born July 12, 1985) is an American former professional tennis player.

Raised in Queens, Robinson showed promise as a junior and moved to Florida to further her tennis. A left-hander player, she ranked second nationally in the 14s age group.

While competing on the professional tour, she reached the best singles world ranking of 416. She won an ITF title in Evansville in 2002 and the following year qualified for the main draw of the Family Circle Cup in Charleston, where she fell in the first round to Marie-Gaiane Mikaelian.

Robinson played collegiate tennis for the University of Georgia and the University of South Florida.

ITF finals

Singles: 1 (1–0)

Doubles: 2 (1–1)

References

External links
 
 

1985 births
Living people
American female tennis players
Tennis people from New York (state)
Sportspeople from Queens, New York
Georgia Lady Bulldogs tennis players
South Florida Bulls women's tennis players